António Stromp (13 June 1894 – 6 July 1921) was a Portuguese sprinter. He competed in the men's 100 metres at the 1912 Summer Olympics.

References

External links
 

1894 births
1921 deaths
Athletes (track and field) at the 1912 Summer Olympics
Portuguese male sprinters
Olympic athletes of Portugal
Athletes from Lisbon